Ogof Dydd Byraf is a cave which extends under Esclusham Mountain in north-east Wales from its entrance in the south face of the Minera Limeworks quarry.  It was originally discovered and explored in 1964 by the Wrexham Caving Club, before they were merged into the North Wales Caving Club.

After a short series of mined passages there is a narrow 10 metre pitch into the main levels consisting of a series of well-decorated galleries.  Some of the passages come very close to the cave Ogof Llyn Du whose access is blocked by a deep and difficult sump.

Over the years this cave had been under threat by the quarry operations, but it is now protected as an SSSI. and owned by North Wales Wildlife Trust

References

Bibliography 
 
 

Dydd Byraf
Landforms of Wrexham County Borough